Lloyd Johansson (born 5 February 1985) is an Australian rugby union professional player of Tongan and Swedish descent. He plays for the Melbourne Rising in the National Rugby Championship, and his usual position is centre.

Early life
Lloyd Johansson was born in Melbourne, Australia to Lloyd 'Loiti' Johansson Snr and Maria ' Malia' Johansson. He played under-14 and under-16 rugby for Victoria before moving to Queensland in 2002 to complete his schooling. He was selected for the Australian Schoolboys rugby union team and also represented Australia at Under 19 and 21 levels.

Career
An inside centre, Johannsson is noted for his hard-running and exceptional defence. He played for the Queensland Reds and captained the East Coast Aces in the now defunct Australian Rugby Championship. He made his Wallabies debut in 2005 against the All Blacks.

Johansson had a challenging Super Rugby season in 2007. He did not see any Super 14 action during the 2008 season and was not offered a contract with the Queensland Reds for 2009. He joined Italian club MPS Viadana in an effort to reignite his career, followed by a stint in 2011 with Japanese club Honda Heat.

In 2012 Johansson become the first Victorian player to earn a Super Rugby contract with the Melbourne Rebels. After playing for Melbourne Harlequin in the Dewar Shield in 2013 and 2014, he was named in the Melbourne Rising squad for the National Rugby Championship inaugural season of 2014.

References

External links
Melbourne Harlequin profile

1985 births
Living people
Australia international rugby union players
Australian expatriate rugby union players
Australian expatriate sportspeople in Italy
Australian expatriate sportspeople in Japan
Australian people of Swedish descent
Australian sportspeople of Tongan descent
Australian rugby union players
Expatriate rugby union players in Italy
Expatriate rugby union players in Japan
Melbourne Rebels players
Melbourne Rising players
Mie Honda Heat players
Queensland Reds players
Rugby union centres
Rugby union players from Melbourne
Rugby Viadana players